Thwing  is a village and civil parish in the Yorkshire Wolds, in the East Riding of Yorkshire, England.

Description

The village has a 12th-century Norman Church (All Saints), and a pub known as The Falling Stone, previously The Rampant Horse, before 1976 the Raincliffe Arms.

The civil parish is sparsely populated, with, according to the 2011 UK census, a population of 203, the same as the 2001 UK census figure. The main settlements are the village of Thwing and the smaller hamlet of Octon. There are farmsteads at Octon Grange, The Wold Cottage, and Willy Howe farm. Land use is almost entirely agricultural, predominately enclosed fields. There is a private crematorium, East Riding Crematorium, at Octon Crossroads, built in 1997.

Between 1894 and 1974 it was a part of the Bridlington Rural District, in the East Riding of Yorkshire. Between 1974 and 1996 it was part of the Borough of North Wolds (later Borough of East Yorkshire), in the county of Humberside.

Although the current civil parish is called "Thwing" its parish council is called "Thwing & Octon Parish Council".

The Falling Stone pub name is a reference to the Wold Cottage Meteorite, which fell nearby on 13 December 1795. A monument to its fall can be visited.

The church, as well as the post office (1830s) and 'Pear Tree farmhouse' (late 18th century) are listed buildings.

Thwing is the birthplace of John Twenge

History and archaeology
See also history of Octon
Thwing is thought to mean 'narrow strip of land', deriving from thvengr (Old Scandinavian) or thweng (Old English). The village is recorded in Domesday Book (1086) as Tuennc, in the hundred of Burton.

The same site also shows evidence of re-use and modification into a hill fort during the Bronze Age, including artefacts typical of the Urnfield culture, and evidence of bronze metalworking. The site was re-used during the Anglo-Saxon period and contained houses including a grubenhaus and large rectangular hall; there was a cemetery with at least 130 inhumations east of the Bronze Age earthwork. During the 1200s a post mill was constructed.

The church of All Saints dates from the 12th century. A market and fair began in Thwing in 1257.

A Wesleyan chapel was established in Thwing in the early 1800s. It was built around 1810, and rebuilt and enlarged around 1839.

From the 1850s to the start of the 21st century the extent of building development in the village was practically unchanged.

There are several other structures identified as barrows in the parish. Other evidence of pre-historic settlement and activity include  polished stone axes and flint implements including arrowheads, chisels and knives, as well as flint cores, tranchet axes and microliths; pebble maceheads; and bronze or Iron Age pottery. A late Bronze Age penannular ring of pale and yellow gold applied on a base metal core was found by metal detection in 2004 near Thwing.

A monastic grange associated with Meaux Abbey was recorded at Octon Grange, north of Octon, in the 12th century.

The Wold Cottage meteorite fell in the parish in 1795, and is commemorated by a monument.

In 1812 the parish's population was recorded as 268 persons in 37 houses; the predominant occupation was farming. It fell during the last decades of the 19th century and the first half of the 20th century: by 1951 it was below the 1811 population level. By the 1961 census the population had been reduced to 244.

See also
John Twenge (Saint John of Bridlington) was born in Thwing in 1320 or 1324.
Marmaduke Thweng, 1st Baron Thweng
Thomas Lamplugh, Archbishop of York was born in Thwing in 1615

Notes

References

Map locations

Sources

External links

Villages in the East Riding of Yorkshire
Civil parishes in the East Riding of Yorkshire
Thwing and Octon